M. ridleyi may refer to:
 Madhuca ridleyi, a plant species endemic to Malaysia
 Myotis ridleyi, the Ridley's bat, a vesper bat species found in Indonesia and Malaysia

See also
 Henry Nicholas Ridley